Ferdinand-François-Auguste Donnet (16 November 1795 in Bourg-Argental, Loire – 23 December 1882) was a French cardinal and Archbishop of Bordeaux (carrying with his colleague of Bourges the title of Primate of Aquitaine).

Life
His ecclesiastical province corresponded broadly with the Roman Aquitania Secunda (including Poitiers) but also included the French Antilles. Donnet argued forcefully for the canonisation of Christopher Columbus. Earlier he had been titular bishop of Rhosus appointed to the diocese of Nancy and Toul. A major figure in Napoleon III's Liberal Empire period he was renowned for his energy, e.g. in publishing and in the restoration of churches in his diocese of Bordeaux (including Bazas though without that title). Donnet was named cardinal by pope Pius IX in 1852 and participated in the conclave of 1878. Eleven volumes of his pastoral instructions, sermons and writings were posthumously published.

References

1795 births
1882 deaths
People from Loire (department)
19th-century French cardinals
Cardinals created by Pope Pius IX
Archbishops of Bordeaux